Michael Clifford Badger is an English singer-songwriter, artist and sculptor from Liverpool, England. Co-founder of The La's he went on to form alternative country/roots rockabilly band The Onset in 1988 and Mike Badger and The Shady Trio in 2010. In addition he is co-owner of Liverpool's independent Viper Label with Paul Hemmings.

Career
In 1997 Badger's first one-man exhibition of recycled art titled Lost and Found was displayed in Warrington Museum, later shown in Bristol Museum 1998, and Leicester City Gallery in 1999. Also, in 1997 Badger created several tin sculptures for Liverpool band Space's album Tin Planet, and for their video of "Avenging Angels".

He has released solo badger albums including Volume in 1999 and Double Zero in 2000 and has recently archived much of his previously unreleased material with albums that include: Lost La's, Lo-Fi Acoustic Excursions, Lo-Fi Electric Excursions, and Mike Badger's Country Side.
In 2006, Badger's sculpture was selected by The Prince's Foundation for Children and The Arts for UK primary school education package, and later that year he began work as Artist in Residence at ITV Granada (celebrating 50 years of broadcasting).

Badger appeared at the SXSW music festival in Austin, Texas, in 2009 and again in 2010, where he performed with local and international acts and featured on Country Music Radio USA. In 2010 he was commissioned to create a permanent suspended sculpture, which he titled A Musical Composition, which hangs in Cavern Walks, Mathew Street, Liverpool, to celebrate what would have been John Lennon's 70th birthday.

Mike Badger and The Shady Trio formed in summer 2010 and have released two studio albums and two singles. In 2015 Badger's autobiography The Rhythm & The Tide (Liverpool, The La's And Ever After) was released; it was co written with music journalist Tim Peacock and published by Liverpool University Press.

Personal life
Badger resides in Liverpool, England. He married his long term girlfriend Jeanette in 1999, and they have two children.

Badger is a lifelong supporter of Everton FC.

Discography
Studio albums
 The Pool of Life - The Onset (1988)
 The Pool of Life Revisited - The Onset (1994)
 Volume - Mike Badger (1999)
 Double Zero (2000) - Mike Badger
 The Onset - The Onset (2005)
 Rogue State - Mike Badger (2011)
 Lucky 13 - Mike Badger and The Shady Trio (2013)
 Honky-Tonk Angels on Motorbikes - Mike Badger and The Shady Trio (2011)

Archive albums
 Breakloose: Lost La's 1984–1986 The La's (1999)
 Callin' All: Lost La's 1986–1987 The La's (2001)
 Lo-Fi Acoustic Excursions - Mike Badger/ Onset/ La's (2003)
 Lo-Fi Electric Excursions - Mike Badger/ Onset/ La's/ Kachinas (2004)
 Mike Badger's Country Side - Mike Badger/ Onset (2009)
 Breakloose: Lost La's 1984–1986 (remastered) - The La's (2009)
 Callin' All: Lost La's 1986–1987 (remastered) - The La's (2010)
 Badger Tracks - The La's/ The Onset/ Mike Badger/ Roy G. Biv (2014)

Compilation appearances
 A Secret Liverpool (one sided album) - Roy G. Biv (1984)
 A Secret Liverpool - The La's (1985)
 Elegance, Charm and Deadly Danger - The La's (1985)
 Unearthed: Liverpool Cult Classics Volume 1 - The Onset (2001)
 Unearthed: Liverpool Cult Classics Volume 2 - The Kachinas (2002)
 The Great Liverpool Acoustic Experiment - Mike Badger (2002)
 Viper 100 - Mike Badger (2014)
 Mellowtone - Mike Badger and The Shady Trio (2014)

Singles & EPs
 The What Say You EP - The Onset (1990)
 "Another Christmas Carol"/"Everybody's Drinking" single - Mike Badger and The Shady Trio (2011)
 "John Got Shot" single - Mike Badger and The Shady Trio (2014)

Art biography
 An Exhibition of Modern Art Exhibition, The Pilgrim Gallery (Liverpool 1984)
 Merseyside Unknowns (Liverpool 1991)
 British Craft Room, Liberty, (London 1996)
 Tin Can Alley Exhibition, Art Reach (Liverpool 1996–97)
 Lost and Found Exhibition, (Warrington Museum 1997)
 Installation for Manchester's Festival of Food. 14-foot long floating tin fish, toured UK waters (1998–present)
 Lost and Found Exhibition, Tubal Cain Gallery, (Harrogate 1998–99)
 Tin Planet Album Cover/ Billboards/ Memorabilia, Space (1998)
 Avenging Angel Music Video/ Memorabilia/ TV advert, (Bristol Museum 1998)
 Lost and Found Exhibition, Bristol Museum (Bristol 1998–99)
 Lost and Found Exhibition, Leicester City Gallery (Leicester 1999)
 This Morning Television Appearance, (ITV 1999)
 Blue Peter Television Appearance, (BBC 1999)
 Joint Exhibition with Amanda Ralph, Gostin Gallery (Liverpool 2000)
 Transformations Pitt Rivers Museum (Oxford 2000)
 Installation, The Sorting House, (Manchester 2002)
 Installation Artist for Mersey River Festivals (Merseyside 2000–2004)
 Installation Artist for Festivals of Street Art (Merseyside 1996–2004)
 Memory Block English Heritage, Liverpool Community Arts Projects (Liverpool 2004)
 Celebrating Fifty Years of Broadcasting ITV Granada Artist in Residence (2006–2007)
 Go Superlambananas Competition Artist ITV Granada (Liverpool 2008)
 The Beat Goes On Exhibition, Liverpool World Museum (Liverpool 2008–2009)
 Go Penguins Mab Lane Youth Centre (Huyton 2009)
 Mike Badger's Reclaimed World The Vitreum, Merchant Taylor's School for Girls (Merseyside 2010)
 A Musical Composition Installation, Cavern Walks (Liverpool 2010)
 Mosaic Installation, Huyton Station Underpass, Knowsley Community Radio (Huyton 2010)
 Honky Tonk Exhibition, The Bluecoat Gallery (Liverpool 2011)
 Tin Planet Robot Museum of Liverpool (Liverpool 2011)
 In The Window, Bluecoat Gallery display centre (Liverpool 2013–14)
 Mike Badger's Post Pop Art Show Exhibition The Vitreum, Merchant Taylor's School for Girls (Merseyside 2014)
 Installation, The Pen Factory (Liverpool 2015)
 Recycled Art Workshops, throughout North West England (2001–present)

See also
 The La's
 The Onset
 The Viper Label

References

External links
 
 
 

1962 births
Living people
English male guitarists
English male singers
English rock guitarists
English rock singers
English male singer-songwriters
The La's members
Musicians from Liverpool
The Viper Label artists